HP ProCurve was the name of the networking division of Hewlett-Packard from 1998 to 2010 and associated with the products that it sold.  The name of the division was changed to HP Networking in September 2010. Please use HP Networking Products for an actual list of products.

The HP ProCurve division sold network switches, wireless access points, WAN routers, and Access Control Servers/Software under the "HP ProCurve" brand name.

Switching

Core Switches 
 8212zl Series - (Released September 2007) Core switch offering, 12-module slot chassis with dual fabric modules and options for dual management modules and system support modules for high availability (HA). IPV6-ready, 692 Gbit/s fabric. Up to 48 10GbE ports, 288 Gb ports, or 288 SFPs. Powered by a combination of either 875W or 1500W PSUs, to provide a maximum of 3600W (5400W using additional power supplies) of power for PoE.

Datacenter Switches 

 6600 Series - (Released February 2009) Datacenter switch offered in five versions. There are four switches with either 24 or 48 Gb ports, with two models featuring four 10GbE SFP ports. There is also a 24 port 10GbE version. All of these feature front to back cooling and removable power supplies.

Interconnect Fabric 
 8100fl series - Chassis based, 8 or 16 slot bays. Supports up to 16 10GE ports / 160 Gigabit Ethernet Ports / 160 SFPs.

Distribution/Aggregator 
 6200yl - Stackable switch, Layer 3, with 24 SFP transceiver ports, and the capability of 10GE ports
 6400cl series - Stackable switch, Layer 3, with either CX4 10GE ports or X2 10GE ports
 6108 - Stackable switch, with 6 Gb ports, and a further 2 Dual Personality Gb ports (either Gb or SFPs)

Managed edge switches

Entry level
2530, 2620 and 2540 lines are Aruba/HPE branded and included for comparison purposes only

Mainstream
2920 line is Aruba/HPE branded and included for comparison purposes only

Chassis/Advanced

Web managed switches 

 1800 series - Fanless 8 or 24 Gb ports. The 1800-24G also has 2 Dual Personality Ports (2 x Gb or SFP). No CLI or SNMP management.
 1700 series - Fanless 7 10/100 ports plus 1 Gb or 22 10/100 ports plus 2 Gb. The 1700-24 also has 2 Dual Personality Ports (2 x Gb or SFPs). No CLI or SNMP management.

Unmanaged Switches 
 2300 series
 2124
 1400 series
 408

Routing

WAN Routers 
 7000dl - Stackable WAN routers with modules for T1/E1, E1+G.703, ADSL2+, Serial, ISDN, and also IPsec VPN.

German company .vantronix marketed software products until 2009.

Mobility 
Due to country laws, ProCurve released different versions of their wireless access points and MultiService Access points.

MultiService Mobility / Access Controllers 

The MSM Access and Mobility Controllers support security, roaming and quality of service across MSM Access Points utilising 802.11 a/b/g/n wireless technology.
MSM710 - Supports up to 10 x MSM Access points. Supports up to 100 Guest Users.
MSM730 - Supports up to 40 x MSM Access points. Supports up to 500 Guest Users.
MSM750 - Supports up to 200 x MSM Access points. Supports up to 2000 Guest Users.
MSM760 - Supports 40 x MSM Access Points, plus license support up to 200
MSM765 - Supports 40 x MSM Access Points, plus license support up to 200. This is a module form, and based on the ProCurve ONE.

MultiService Access Points 
Most access points are designed to work in controlled mode: a controller manages and provides authentication services for them.

MSM310 - Single 802.11a/b/g radio.  Includes 2.4 GHz dipole antennas
MSM310-R - External use. Single 802.11a/b/g radio.  Includes 2.4 GHz dipole antennas
MSM313 - Integrated MSM Controller + single radio Access Point
MSM313-R - External Use. Integrated MSM Controller + single radio Access Point
MSM317 - Single 802.11b/g radio, with integrated 4 port switch
MSM320 - Dual radios (802.11a/b/g + 802.11a/b/g) for outdoor deployment options.  Includes 2.4 GHz dipole antennas. Supports PoE.
MSM320-R - External use. Dual radios (802.11a/b/g + 802.11a/b/g). Includes 2.4 GHz dipole antennas. Supports PoE.
MSM323 - Integrated MSM Controller + dual radio Access point.
MSM323-R - External Use. Integrated MSM Controller + dual radio Access point.
MSM325 - Dual radios (802.11a/b/g + 802.11a/b/g) including RF security sensor. Requires PoE
MSM335 - Triple radios (802.11a/b/g + 802.11a/b/g + 802.11a/b/g RF security sensor)
MSM410 - Single 802.11 a/b/g/n radio. Requires PoE. Internal antenna only.
MSM422 - Dual-radio 802.11n + 802.11a/b/g.
MSM460 - Dual-Radio 802.11a/b/g/n. Only internal 3x3 MIMO Antenna. Requires PoE.
MSM466 - Same as MSM460 but with external 3x3 MIMO antenna connectors, no internal antenna. Requires PoE.

Centralised wireless 

Wireless Edge Services Module - Controls Radio ports, and is an integrated module that fits into ProCurve Switches 5300xl / 5400zl / 8200zl only. Redundant Module available for failover. Supports the following Radio Ports:
 RP-210 - Single 802.11b/g radio and integrated antenna
 RP-220 - Dual-radio design (one 802.11a and one 802.11b/g); plenum rated; external antennas required
 RP-230 - Dual-radio design (one 802.11a and one 802.11b/g); features internal, integrated antennas

Wireless access points 
M110 - Single 802.11a/b/g radio
M111 - Wireless Client Bridge including dual band antennas
 AP-530 - Wireless access point; Dual radios support simultaneous 802.11a and 802.11b/g transmissions. The AP-530 has two integrated radios (one of which supports 802.11a/b/g; the other of which supports 802.11b/g). The AP supports the Wireless Distribution System.
 AP-420 - Wireless access point; Features a single, dual-diversity 802.11b/g radio.
 AP-10ag - Wireless access point; Dual radios support simultaneous 802.11a and 802.11b/g transmissions.

Management Software 
ProCurve Manager (PCM) is a network management suite for products by ProCurve.

 ProCurve Manager 
ProCurve Manager comes in two versions; a base version supplied both free of charge with all managed ProCurve Products and also for download, and a "Plus" version that incorporates more advanced functionality and also enables plugin support. There is a 60-day trial version including all modules. Both derive from the trial version and need to be activated via Internet.

The Plus version can also be implemented in HP OpenView Network Node Manager for Windows. The software ProCurve Manager is predominantly for ProCurve products.

 Protocols 
 PCM uses Link Layer Discovery Protocol (LLDP, Cisco Discovery Protocol (CDP) and FDP (Foundry) for detecting network devices
 For identification and deep inspection of network devices SNMP V2c or V3 is used.
 Network traffic is analysed using RMON and sFlow.

 Plugins 
 IDM (Identity Driven Manager) - Add-on Module for PCM+; contains Intranet Network Access Security using 802.1X; compatible with MicrosoftNetwork Access Protection (NAP) since Version IDM V2.3
 NIM (Network Immunity Manager) - Add-On Module for PCM+ v2.2 and above; contains Intranet Intrusion Detection and Network Behavior Anomaly Detection (NBAD) using sFlow
 PMM (ProCurve Mobility Manager) - Add-on Module for PCM+; contains Element Management for ProCurve Access Points (420/520/530) starting from Version PMM V1; WESM Modules and Radio Ports are supported since Version PMM V2. Since PMM v3, the MSM Access Points and Controllers are now supported

 Security 

 Network Access Control with Endpoint testing 
 ProCurve Network Access Controller 800 - Management and Security for Endpoints when they access the Network

 Firewall 
The Threat Management Services Module is based on the ProCurve ONE Module, and is primarily a firewall with additional Intrusion-prevention system and VPN capabilities

 Accessories 

 External power supplies 
 ProCurve 600 Redundant external power supply - supports one of six times Redundant Power for series 2600-PWR (not series 2600 w/o PWR), 2610, 2800, 3400cl, 6400cl and 7000dl as well as two times optional External PoE Power for series 2600-PWR, 2610-PWR or mandatory External PoE Power for series 5300 with xl 24-Port 10/100-TX PoE Module only
 ProCurve 610 External power supply - supports four times optional External PoE Power for series 2600-PWR, 2610-PWR, or mandatory External PoE Power for series 5300 with xl 24-Port 10/100-TX PoE Module only
 ProCurve 620 Redundant/External power supply - supports two times optional External PoE Power for series 3500yl and two times Redundant Power for series 2900, 3500yl and 6200yl
 ProCurve Switch zl power supply shelf - supports two times optional External PoE Power for series 5400zl and 8200zl; must be additionally equipped with max. two 875W or 1500W (typical) ProCurve Switch zl power supplies

 GBICs and optics 
ProCurve have a range of Transceivers, GBICs and 10GbE optics for use within ProCurve devices.Transceivers are used in the unmanaged 2100 & 2300 series, and the managed 2500 series of switchesGBICs are used for most switches for 100 Mbit/s and 1000 Mbit/s fiber connectivity. All fiber GBICs have an LC presentation.

 ProCurve ONE 

 HP ProCurve ONE Services zl Module 

The HP ProCurve ONE Services zl Module is an x86-based server module that provides two 10-GbE network links into the switch backplane. Coupled with ProCurve-certified services and applications that can take advantage of the switch-targeted API for better performance, this module creates a virtual appliance within a switch slot to provide solutions for business needs, such as network security. The ProCurve ONE Services zl Module is supported in the following switches:

 HP ProCurve Switch 5406zl
 HP ProCurve Switch 5412zl
 HP ProCurve Switch 8212zl

The following applications have completed, or will complete the ProCurve ONE Integrated certification on the HP ProCurve Services zl Module in early 2009.Data center automation HP ProCurve Data Center Connection Manager ONE Software (Q3 2009)Location Ekahau Real Time Location SystemWireless IPS AirTight Networks SpectraGuard EnterpriseNetwork management InMon Corporation Traffic SentinelVoIP / Unified Communications Aastra 5000 Next Generation IP telephony
 Avaya Unified Communications SolutionsVideo distribution VBrick Systems ViPOther - Unsupported'''

Other 'unofficial' methods for loading alternative platform software such as pfSense and VMware's ESXi on to ONE Service'' modules have been discovered.

HP ZL Compute Blade on the Cheap | Tinkeringdadblog

Discontinued Products 
 1600M - stackable Layer 2 switch
 2400M - stackable Layer 2 switch
 2424M - stackable Layer 2 switch
 4000M - modular Layer 2 switch
 8000M - modular Layer 2 switch
 9400 - modular Layer 3 Router
 AP 520 - Access Point
 4100gl - modular Layer 2 switch
 2700 series - unmanaged Layer 2 switch
 9300m series - modular Layer 3 Router
 ProCurve Access Controller Series 700wl
 745wl
 ACM (Access Control Module) for the 5300xl only
  5300xl series - Chassis based, Layer 3, in either 4 or 8 slot bays.

See also
 Aruba Networks
 HP Networking Products
 ProCurve

References

External links 
 HPE Networking website
 VisioCafe (Home of HP VisioShapes)

ProCurve
Network management